Phil McCrea (1948-2016) was president of the National Association of Biology Teachers. He was a biology instructor who also published scholarly works, won the Illinois Outstanding Biology Teacher Award, and appeared on Oprah as an expert on household sanitation.

Employment
Phil McCrea was a biology teacher at New Trier High School in Northfield, Illinois and taught at The College of Lake County (CLC) in Grayslake, Illinois and at Mchenry Community College (MCC) in Crystal Lake, IL. He taught at New Trier starting in 1971, at CLC since 1995, and at MCC starting the summer of 2008. He won the outstanding part-time faculty award from the College of Lake County in 2006. At New Trier, he was a sponsor of the Biology Club as well as the Biology Coach for Science Olympiad.

Educational background
Phil McCrea received his bachelor's degree in Science from the University of Illinois Chicago (UIC) in 1970, and also received his master's degree in Behavioral Genetics in 1974 from UIC.

Awards and honors
Phil McCrea was the President of the National Association of Biology Teachers in 2000. He was also the Executive secretary and Treasurer of the Illinois Association of Biology Teachers since 1981  In 1980 he won the Outstanding Biology Teacher Award for Illinois. Furthermore, he was a member of the Council of Scientific Society Presidents from 1999 to 2001.

Oprah
Another claim to fame was his appearance on The Oprah Winfrey Show in 1997. He was invited as a biologist to comment about household sanitation issues. The theme of the episode was "Things to Get Rid Of." Phil commented on items such as mascara brushes and makeup sponges that were a breeding ground for bacteria.

Other interests
McCrea was also an accomplished folk-style guitar player, and had a deep soothing voice with which he sang songs about evolution and DNA to his classes.  He had a talent for making art as well and designed a spa-like window for his home and tile designs on his kitchen floor. He also enjoyed working in wood, cutting and painting yard ornaments, and highlighting displays of furniture and appliances.

References

External links
Phil McCrea's Home Page
Home Page of the College of Lake County
Home Page for the University of Illinois Chicago

1948 births
American educators
University of Illinois alumni
Living people